Pallai, also spelt Palai, is a small town in the Kilinochchi District, Northern Province, Sri Lanka.

In 1861 the Church Mission Society sent Rev. John Backus to Pallai to establish a Christian community in the town. This led to the construction and dedication of St. Andrew's Church on 30 November 1895.

In 1921 the government declared a  area adjacent to the town as a forest reserve.

Transport 

Pallai is located on the (A9) Kandy-Jaffna Highway.

It is served by a railway station on the national network which was out of use due to war damage. In 2009, agreements were made to restore the line back into service. The railway resumed operation on 4 March 2014.

See also 
 Railway stations in Sri Lanka
 Pallai railway station

References 

Towns in Kilinochchi District
Pachchilaipalli DS Division